Hemerotrecha is a genus of Eremobatid camel spiders, first described by Nathan Banks in 1903.

Species
, the World Solifugae Catalog accepts the following thirty-five species:

 Hemerotrecha banksi Muma, 1951 — US (California)
 Hemerotrecha bixleri Muma, 1989 — US (Arizona)
 Hemerotrecha branchi Muma, 1951 — Mexico, US (Arizona, California, Nevada, New Mexico)
 Hemerotrecha californica (Banks, 1899) — US (Arizona, California, Nevada, New Mexico, Oregon)
 Hemerotrecha carsonana Muma, 1989 — US (Nevada)
 Hemerotrecha cazieri Muma, 1986 — Mexico
 Hemerotrecha cornuta Brookhart & Cushing, 2002 — US (Colorado)
 Hemerotrecha delicatula Muma, 1989 — US (Utah)
 Hemerotrecha denticulata Muma, 1951 — Canada (British Columbia), US (California, Colorado, Idaho, Nevada, Utah, Washington)
 Hemerotrecha elpasoensis Muma, 1962 — US (Texas)
 Hemerotrecha fruitana Muma, 1951 — US (California, Colorado, Nevada, New Mexico, Utah, Wyoming)
 Hemerotrecha hanfordana Brookhart & Cushing, 2008 — US (California, Oregon, Utah, Washington)
 Hemerotrecha jacintoana Muma, 1962 — US (California, Nevada)
 Hemerotrecha kaboomi Brookhart & Cushing, 2008 — US (Nevada)
 Hemerotrecha macra Muma, 1951 — US (Oklahoma)
 Hemerotrecha marathoni Muma, 1962 — US (New Mexico, Texas)
 Hemerotrecha marginata (Kraepelin, 1910) — US
 Hemerotrecha maricopana Muma, 1989 — US (Arizona)
 Hemerotrecha milsteadi Muma, 1962 — US (New Mexico, Texas)
 Hemerotrecha minima Muma, 1951 — US (Colorado, Texas)
 Hemerotrecha neotena Muma, 1989 — US (Arizona)
 Hemerotrecha nevadensis Muma, 1951 — US (Nevada)
 Hemerotrecha parva Muma, 1989 — US (Utah)
 Hemerotrecha prenticei Brookhart & Cushing, 2008 — US (California)
 Hemerotrecha proxima Muma, 1963 — US (Nevada)
 Hemerotrecha pseudotruncata Brookhart & Cushing, 2008 — US (California, Nevada)
 Hemerotrecha serrata Muma, 1951 — US (California, Nevada)
 Hemerotrecha sevilleta Brookhart & Cushing, 2002 — US (New Mexico)
 Hemerotrecha simplex Muma, 1951 — US (Arizona, California)
 Hemerotrecha steckleri Muma, 1951 — US (Arizona)
 Hemerotrecha texana Muma, 1951 — US (Texas)
 Hemerotrecha truncata Muma, 1951 — US (California)
 Hemerotrecha vetteri Brookhart & Cushing, 2008 — US (California)
 Hemerotrecha werneri Muma, 1951 — US (Arizona)
 Hemerotrecha xena Banks, 1903 — US (California)

References

Further reading

External links

 

Solifugae
Articles created by Qbugbot